Benedykt of Sandomierz (Polish: Benedykt z Sandomierza) was a Polish Renaissance architect, who together with Bartolommeo Berrecci rebuilt the Wawel Royal Castle in Kraków under the rule of Sigismund I of Poland after it burnt down in 1499.

Architects from Kraków
Renaissance architects